John Carmichael (4 July 1858 – 24 August 1914) was an English cricketer. He played fourteen first-class matches for Surrey between 1876 and 1881.

See also
 List of Surrey County Cricket Club players

References

External links
 

1858 births
1914 deaths
English cricketers
Surrey cricketers
People from Howden
Cricketers from Yorkshire